Momin Pur is a small village bordering Jalalia along Indus River in Chhachh Valley of Attock District in Punjab, Pakistan.

References

Villages in Attock District